In 1952, the United Kingdom was the third country to develop and test nuclear weapons, after the United States and Soviet Union. and is one of the five nuclear-weapon states under the Treaty on the Non-Proliferation of Nuclear Weapons.

The UK initiated a nuclear weapons programme, codenamed Tube Alloys, during the Second World War. At the Quebec Conference in August 1943, it was merged with the American Manhattan Project. The British contribution to the Manhattan Project saw British scientists participate in most of its work. The British government considered nuclear weapons to be a joint discovery, but the American Atomic Energy Act of 1946 (McMahon Act) restricted other countries, including the UK, from access to information about nuclear weapons. Fearing the loss of Britain's great power status, the UK resumed its own project, now codenamed High Explosive Research. On 3 October 1952, it detonated an atomic bomb in the Monte Bello Islands in Australia in Operation Hurricane. Eleven more British nuclear weapons tests in Australia were carried out over the following decade, including seven British nuclear tests at Maralinga in 1956 and 1957.

The British hydrogen bomb programme demonstrated Britain's ability to produce thermonuclear weapons in the Operation Grapple nuclear tests in the Pacific, and led to the amendment of the McMahon Act.  Since the 1958 US–UK Mutual Defence Agreement, the US and the UK have cooperated extensively on nuclear security matters. The nuclear Special Relationship between the two countries has involved the exchange of classified scientific data and fissile materials such as uranium-235 and plutonium. After the cancellation of the Blue Streak in 1960, the US supplied the UK with Polaris missiles and nuclear submarine technology. The US also supplied the Royal Air Force and British Army of the Rhine with nuclear weapons under Project E in the form of aerial bombs, missiles, depth charges and artillery shells until 1992. Nuclear-capable American aircraft have been based in the UK since 1949, but the last US nuclear weapons were withdrawn in 2006. In 1982, the Polaris Sales Agreement was amended to allow the UK to purchase Trident II missiles. Since 1998, when the UK decommissioned its tactical WE.177 bombs, the Trident has been the only operational nuclear weapons system in British service.

1913
H. G. Wells coins the term "atomic bomb" in his novel The World Set Free.

1932
 February: The neutron discovered by James Chadwick at the Cavendish Laboratory at the University of Cambridge.
 April: John Cockcroft and Ernest Walton split lithium nuclei with accelerated protons at the Cavendish Laboratory.

1933
 Ernest Rutherford and Mark Oliphant discover helium-3 and tritium.

1938
 December: In Germany, Otto Hahn and Fritz Strassmann bombard uranium with neutrons, and discover that the uranium  had been split.

1939
 January: Lise Meitner and Otto Frisch publish a theoretical justification for the process in Nature, which they call "fission".
 January: Niels Bohr and John A. Wheeler apply the liquid drop model developed by Bohr and Fritz Kalckar to explain the mechanism of nuclear fission. Bohr hypothesises that uranium-235 is largely responsible.
 3 September: Great Britain and France declare war on Nazi Germany in response to its invasion of Poland, beginning World War II in Europe.

1940 
 March: The Frisch–Peierls memorandum estimates that a few kilograms of pure uranium-235 would explode with the energy of thousands of tons of dynamite.
 April: MAUD Committee is set up to investigate.

1941 
 July: MAUD Committee issues its report. Endorses conclusion that a practical atomic bomb is possible.
 November: Tube Alloys directorate created to coordinate the effort to develop an atomic bomb. Sir John Anderson, the Lord President of the Council, becomes the minister responsible, and Wallace Akers from Imperial Chemical Industries (ICI) is appointed its director.

1943
 August 1943: Quebec Agreement merges Tube Alloys with the American Manhattan Project, and creates the Combined Policy Committee and Combined Development Trust.

1944 
 September: Hyde Park Aide-Mémoire extends cooperation to the post-war era.

1945 
 July: Field Marshal Sir Henry Maitland Wilson authorises the use of nuclear weapons against Japan as a decision of the Combined Policy Committee.
 August: Bombing of Hiroshima and Nagasaki.
 August: Clement Attlee creates Advisory Coimmittee on Atomic Energy under the chairmanship of Sir John Anderson.
 October: Chiefs of Staff Committee recommend that Britain produce atomic weapons.
 November: Tube Alloys Directorate transferred to the Ministry of Supply.
 November: Washington Agreement confirms post-war collaboration; replaces the Quebec Agreement's requirement for "mutual consent" before using nuclear weapons with one for "prior consultation".

1946 
 February: British physicist Alan Nunn May is arrested as a Soviet spy after being fingered by Soviet defector Igor Gouzenko.
 March: Lord Portal becomes Controller of Production, Atomic Energy (CPAE).
 August: McMahon Act prohibits the US government releasing restricted data to any foreign power, thereby ending technical cooperation with the UK.

1947 
 January: Cabinet subcommittee approves the manufacture of nuclear weapons.
 June: Nine non-nuclear capable B-29 Superfortress bombers of the 97th Bombardment Group deploy to RAF Marham, beginning the presence of the Strategic Air Command in the United Kingdom.
 December: V bombers are ordered.

1948 
 January: Britain gives up the right to be consulted on the use of nuclear weapons as part of the Modus Vivendi.

1949 
 April: North Atlantic Treaty is signed.
 April: The first nuclear-capable B-29 bombers deploy to the UK.
 August: Soviet Union tests Joe-1, its first nuclear weapon.

1950 
 April: Aldermaston taken over; becomes centre of UK atomic weapons research.
 June: North Korea invades South Korea, starting the Korean War.

1951 
 June: Donald Maclean, who had served as a British member of the Combined Policy Committee from January 1947 to August 1948, defects to the Soviet Union.

1952 
 January: British-German physicist Klaus Fuchs is arrested and confesses to being a Soviet spy. 
 June: United States Air Force in the United Kingdom receives its own nuclear weapons.
 October: First British nuclear weapon is tested in the Monte Bello Islands in Western Australia  in Operation Hurricane.
 November: United States tests Ivy Mike, a thermonuclear device.

1953 
 October: Operation Totem, the first nuclear tests on the Australian mainland, conducted at Emu Field in the Great Victoria Desert in South Australia.

1954 
 July: British government decides to initiate a British hydrogen bomb programme.

1956 
 May–June: Operation Mosaics test in the Monte Bello Islands in the Australia.
 September–October: First British nuclear tests at Maralinga.
 October–November: Suez Crisis: Britain is forced to abandon invasion of Egypt under US financial pressure.

1957 
 April: 1957 Defence White Paper emphasises nuclear weapons to replace Britain's declining conventional military capabilities.
 May: First British hydrogen bomb test in Operation Grapple off Malden Island in the Pacific is a failure.
 May: Memorandum of Understanding with the US regarding the loan of nuclear weapons to the UK in wartime.
 September–October: Operation Antler Trials at Maralinga.
 October: Sputnik crisis erupts when Soviets launch the first artificial satellite.
 November: First successful British  hydrogen bomb test off Christmas Island.

1958 
 July: MacMahon Act is amended to allow nuclear cooperation to resume and the 1958 US–UK Mutual Defence Agreement is signed, restoring the nuclear Special Relationship.
 September: Britain conducts its last atmospheric nuclear test off Malden Island.

1959 
 January: The first Thor missiles supplied to the UK by the US become operational.

1960 
 March: Harold Macmillan negotiates the purchase of Skybolt from the United States after the cancellation of Blue Streak in return for  permission to base the US Navy's Polaris missile-equipped ballistic missile submarines at the Holy Loch in Scotland.
 October: Labour Party conference adopts a policy of unilateral nuclear disarmament.

1961 
 March: US Polaris submarines deploy to the Holy Loch.

1962 
 October: British nuclear forces on alert during the Cuban Missile Crisis.
 December: When the US moves to cancel Skybolt, Macmillan meets with President John F. Kennedy, and negotiates the Nassau Agreement, under which the UK is permitted to purchase Polaris missile technology.

1963 
 April: Polaris Sales Agreement is signed.
 August: The United Kingdom, along with the United States and the Soviet Union, signs the Partial Test Ban Treaty, which restricts it to underground nuclear tests by outlawing testing in the atmosphere, underwater, or in outer space.
 August: Last Thor missiles leave the UK.

1965 
 June: US 7th Air Division discontinued, ends Strategic Air Command presence in the UK except for visits.

1967 
 January: UK signs the Outer Space Treaty, banning nuclear weapons from space.

1968 
July: UK signs the Non-proliferation treaty.

1973 
 April: Heath ministry approves the Chevaline programme to upgrade Polaris.

1979 
 January: US President Jimmy Carter agrees to sell the Trident I missile system to Britain.

1981 
 August: US President Ronald Reagan offers to sell the Trident II missile system to Britain.

1982 
 September–October: Labour Party Conference adopts a platform calling for the scrapping of Polaris and the cancellation of Trident.
  October: Trident sales agreement is signed.

1984 
 January: US cruise missiles are deployed to  RAF Greenham Common and RAF Molesworth as a consequence of the 1979 NATO Double-Track Decision.

1988 
June: Labour Party leader Neil Kinnock abandons the commitment to unilateral nuclear disarmament.

1991 
 November: Julin Bristol, the last British nuclear test, is conducted in the United States.

1992 
 March: The US Polaris submarine base at Holy Loch is closed.

1996 
 September: The UK signs the Comprehensive Test Ban Treaty, ending all nuclear testing.

1998 

 UK decommissions its tactical WE.177 bombs.

2006 
 December: Last US tactical nuclear weapons in the UK are removed.

2016 
 July: House of Commons votes to proceed with construction of this next generation of Trident submarines.

Notes

References

 
 
 
 

 

 
 
 

 
 
 
 
 
 
 
 
 
 
 
 
 
 
 
 
 
 
 
 

Nuclear history of the United Kingdom
Nuclear weapons programme of the United Kingdom